JSC Starline KZ, styled as StarLine.kz, was an airline based in Aktobe, Kazakhstan, which offered scheduled passenger flights from its bases at Aktobe Airport and Astana International Airport to destinations within Kazakhstan, Turkey and the United Arab Emirates, using a fleet of two Boeing 737-200 aircraft.

History 

Starline was established in late 2005, though flight operations were only launched in May 2007. On 1 April 2009, the airline had its airline license revoked, shortly before all Kazakh airlines but Air Astana were banned from entering EU airspace due to the poor maintenance standards in the country.

References

Defunct airlines of Kazakhstan
Airlines established in 2005
Airlines disestablished in 2009